Magia is the debut studio album by Colombian singer and songwriter Shakira. It was released in June 1991 by Sony Music Colombia, with whom she signed a three-album recording contract. The record is a collection of pop ballads Shakira wrote since she was eight years old, with themes inspired from the experience hanging out with males, adventure stories, and dreams of living on the coast.

The album's live performances helped Shakira receive attention on Colombian media, and the LP earned her an award at the Viña del Mar International Song Festival. However, it was not a commercial success, with sales estimated at between 1,000 and 1,200 copies. By Shakira's request, Magia and its follow-up Peligro (1993) were removed from music markets. "Magia" was released as promotional single in 1991.

Development and composition
Born in Barranquilla, Colombia, Shakira began writing songs at the age of eight years, her first one being "Tus Gafas Oscuras". Her performances at local competitions led to a meeting with local theater producer Monica Ariza, who later held an audition for her in Bogotá. She performed three songs for executives of Sony Music Colombia, who were impressed enough to sign her, at the age of 13, to record three albums, which were Magia, Peligro and Pies Descalzos.

The low-budget Magia was put in almost three months of pre-production, which involved choreography of live performances for the album, singing lessons for Shakira, and arranging the songs. The concept of the music still reflected her personality, despite the fact that it was managed by the record label. The tracks deal with emotions of a person's first time falling in love, and range from a love poem ("Sueños") to a celebration of dance ("Esta noche voy contigo"). These were influenced from experiences with males such as her ex-boyfriend Oscar Pardo, stories told by her father, and dreams of living on the coast. In the book Shakira: Woman Full of Grace, Ximena Diego wrote that the album "demonstrated her [Shakira's] indisputable potential."

Magia is a collection of songs written by Shakira between the ages of 8 and 12, and mainly consists of pop ballads. It was produced by Miguel E. Cubillos and Pablo Tedeschi, and recorded at Aga Studios in Bogotá, when Shakira was 13. A Sony Music Colombia representative said that the recording process was simple and went perfectly fine. But for Shakira, the process was problematic, as she had no ability to decide which tracks would be included and no input into the rhythmic structure or artistic production of the songs.

Release and promotion
To promote the launch of the album, as a suggestion from Shakira, live performances were held in locations such as Teatro Amira de la Rosa, Cartagena, Santa Marta, Riohacha, Medellín, Cali, Bogotá, and other various theaters and events, all of which received print, radio and television coverage. The performances featured additional dancers and background vocalists such as César Navarro, Guillermo Gómez, Mauricio Pinilla, and Richard Ricardo. A music video was done for "Magia", which Navarro also starred in. Navarro found working with Shakira enjoyable and relaxing, and recalled her as sensitive and energetic: "She was a tireless worker, but more than anything, she was a total blast." The choreography for the performances was done by Gary Julio and Ray Silva. The album won an award at the Viña del Mar International Song Festival in 1991, although Shakira was not able to attend the ceremony as she was less than 16. Despite the live performances and the amount of media coverage, the LP did not fare well commercially; between 1,000 and 1,200 copies were sold in her home country.

Initially, Shakira refused to allow the re-release of both Magia and her next album, Peligro, because of their "immaturity."

Track listing

Personnel
Credits from liner notes:
Shakira – songwriter, vocals
Sergio Solano – acoustic and electric guitars
Antonio "Toño" Arnedo – saxophone
Miguel Enrique Cubillos N. – producer, songwriter, music direction, artistic arrangement, vocal direction, chorus
Ana Maria Gónzalez-Liliana Avila – chorus
Juanita Loboguerrero – songwriter
Miguel E. Cubillos – producer, songwriter, music direction, artistic arrangement, vocal direction
Pablo Tedeschi – producer, songwriter, musical direction, arrangement, computer programming, synthesizer programming, drum programming
Alvaro Eduardo Ortiz Q – design
Gabriel Muñoz – general coordination
Luis Miguel Olivar – sound engineer, mixing engineer
Leo Erazzo – album artwork

References

Bibliography

1991 debut albums
Shakira albums
Sony Music Colombia albums
Spanish-language albums